Mecas is a genus of longhorn beetles found in North America, containing the following species:

subgenus Dylobolus
 Mecas rotundicollis (Thomson, 1868)

subgenus Mecas
 Mecas albovitticollis Breuning, 1955
 Mecas ambigena Bates, 1881
 Mecas bicallosa Martin, 1924
 Mecas cana (Newman, 1840)
 Mecas cineracea Casey, 1913
 Mecas cinerea (Newman, 1840)
 Mecas cirrosa Chemsak & Linsley, 1973
 Mecas confusa Chemsak & Linsley, 1973
 Mecas femoralis (Haldeman, 1847)
 Mecas humeralis Chemsak & Linsley, 1973
 Mecas linsleyi Knull, 1947
 Mecas marginella LeConte, 1873
 Mecas marmorata Gahan, 1892
 Mecas menthae Chemsak & Linsley, 1973
 Mecas obereoides Bates, 1881
 Mecas pergrata (Say, 1824)

subgenus Pannychis
 Mecas sericea (Thomson, 1864)

References

Saperdini